Maly Muynak (Malay Muynaq) is a rural locality (a village) in Surensky Selsoviet, Zianchurinsky District, Bashkortostan, Russia. The population was 96 as of 2010. There is 1 street.

Geography 
Maly Muynak is located 16 km southeast of Isyangulovo (the district's administrative centre) by road. Bogdanovka is the nearest rural locality.

References 

Rural localities in Zianchurinsky District